FC Torpedo Mytishchi was a Russian football team from Mytishchi , Moscow Region. It played professionally from 1929 to 1995. Their best result was 1st place in the Zone 4 of the Russian Second Division in 1993.

Team name history
 1929 -1992: FC Torpedo Mytishchi
 1993 -1994: FC Torpedo-MKB Mytishchi
 1995 : FC Torpedo Mytishchi

External links
  Team history at KLISF

Association football clubs established in 1991
Association football clubs disestablished in 1996
Defunct football clubs in Russia
Football in Moscow Oblast
1991 establishments in Russia
1996 disestablishments in Russia